Angonyx williami is a moth of the  family Sphingidae. It is known from the Moluccas in Indonesia.

References

Angonyx
Moths described in 2009
Moths of Indonesia